The 1975 St. Louis Cardinals season was the team's 94th season in St. Louis, Missouri and its 84th season in the National League. The Cardinals went 82–80 during the season and finished in a tie for third (with the New York Mets) in the National League East, 10 games behind the Pittsburgh Pirates.

Offseason 
 October 14, 1974: Marc Hill was traded by the Cardinals to the San Francisco Giants for Ken Rudolph and Elías Sosa.
 November 18, 1974: Alan Foster, Rich Folkers and Sonny Siebert were traded by the Cardinals to the San Diego Padres as part of a three team trade. The Padres sent a player to be named later to the Cardinals, and the Detroit Tigers sent Ed Brinkman to the Cardinals. The Tigers sent Bob Strampe and Dick Sharon to the Padres. The Padres sent Nate Colbert to the Tigers. The Padres completed the deal by sending Danny Breeden to the Cardinals on December 12.
 March 26, 1975: Ron Hunt was released by the Cardinals.
 March 29, 1975: Danny Godby was traded by the Cardinals to the Boston Red Sox for Danny Cater.

Regular season 
Third baseman Ken Reitz won a Gold Glove this year.  1975 was also the final major league season for pitcher Bob Gibson.

Season standings

Record vs. opponents

Opening Day starters 
 Ed Brinkman
 Lou Brock
 Bob Gibson
 Keith Hernandez
 Bake McBride
 Ken Reitz
 Ted Simmons
 Ted Sizemore
 Reggie Smith

Notable transactions 
 May 28, 1975: Elías Sosa and Ray Sadecki were traded by the Cardinals to the Atlanta Braves for Ron Reed and a player to be named later. The Braves completed the deal by sending Wayne Nordhagen to the Cardinals on June 2.
 June 3, 1975: Jim Lentine was drafted by the Cardinals in the 12th round of the 1975 Major League Baseball Draft.
 June 4, 1975: Ed Brinkman and Tommy Moore were traded by the Cardinals to the Texas Rangers for Willie Davis.
 July 22, 1975: Ken Crosby was traded by the Cardinals to the Chicago Cubs for Eddie Solomon.

Roster

Player stats

Batting

Starters by position 
Note: Pos = Position; G = Games played; AB = At bats; H = Hits; Avg. = Batting average; HR = Home runs; RBI = Runs batted in

Other batters 
Note: G = Games played; AB = At bats; H = Hits; Avg. = Batting average; HR = Home runs; RBI = Runs batted in

Pitching

Starting pitchers 
Note: G = Games pitched; IP = Innings pitched; W = Wins; L = Losses; ERA = Earned run average; SO = Strikeouts

Other pitchers 
Note: G = Games pitched; IP = Innings pitched; W = Wins; L = Losses; ERA = Earned run average; SO = Strikeouts

Relief pitchers 
Note: G = Games pitched; W = Wins; L = Losses; SV = Saves; ERA = Earned run average; SO = Strikeouts

Awards and honors 
 Lou Brock, Roberto Clemente Award

Farm system 

LEAGUE CHAMPIONS: St. Petersburg, Johnson City

References

External links
1975 St. Louis Cardinals at Baseball Reference
1975 St. Louis Cardinals team page at www.baseball-almanac.com

St. Louis Cardinals seasons
Saint Louis Cardinals season
St Louis